World So Cold may refer to:

 "World So Cold" (Mudvayne song)
 "World So Cold" (Three Days Grace song)
 "World So Cold" (A-Lee song)